KBAJ (105.5 FM, "J105 The Thunder") is a classic rock radio station licensed to Deer River, Minnesota, and is owned by Rapids Radio. 

The radio station went on-air in 1999. Originally owned by Red Rock Radio Corp., it was a KQDS-FM simulcast. On January 1, 2017, KBAJ was sold by Red Rock Radio Corp. to Lamke Broadcasting and rebranded as "J105 The Thunder", still keeping the classic rock format. The sale, at a price of $200,000, was consummated on March 1, 2017.

In November 2021, The station and its sister stations were sold the Steve Hallstrom and Scott Hennen branding themselves as Rapids Radio.

In the winter of 2017, KBAJ became the broadcast home for championship Grand Rapids High School hockey.

KOZY (AM) and KMFY are also owned by Rapids Radio.

References

External links

Radio stations in Minnesota
Classic rock radio stations in the United States
Radio stations established in 2000
2000 establishments in Minnesota